The men's 10 kilometres walk event was part of the track and field athletics programme at the 1924 Summer Olympics. It was the only racewalking event at this Games. After 1924, the 10 kilometre walk would not be held again until 1948. The competition was held from Wednesday, July 9, 1924, to Sunday, July 13, 1924. The races were held on the track which was as for all other events of 500 metres in circumference. Twenty-five race walkers from 13 nations competed.

Records
These were the standing world and Olympic records (in minutes) prior to the 1924 Summer Olympics.

Results

Semifinals

The first semi-final was held on Wednesday, July 9, 1924. The best five finishers qualified for the final.

Semifinal 1

Semifinal 2

The second semi-final was held on Friday, July 11, 1924. After a protest against his disqualification Rudolf Kühnel was allowed to start also in this race - he was disqualified again. The best five finishers qualified for the final.

Final
The final was held on Sunday, July 13, 1924.

References

External links
Olympic Report
 

Men's walk 10 kilometre
Racewalking at the Olympics